Celiny  is a village in the administrative district of Gmina Ożarowice, within Tarnowskie Góry County, Silesian Voivodeship, in southern Poland.

The village has a population of 260.

During the German occupation of Poland (World War II), in 1940, the Germans carried out a massacre of 29 Poles, merchants, miners, craftsmen and workers from various nearby cities, in Celiny (see Nazi crimes against the Polish nation).

References

Villages in Tarnowskie Góry County